Eliécer Ellis (born 13 December 1945 in Santiago de Veraguas) is a Panamanian former basketball player who competed in the 1968 Summer Olympics.

References

1945 births
Living people
Panamanian men's basketball players
Olympic basketball players of Panama
Basketball players at the 1968 Summer Olympics
Basketball players at the 1967 Pan American Games
Pan American Games bronze medalists for Panama
Pan American Games medalists in basketball
People from Santiago District, Veraguas
Medalists at the 1967 Pan American Games
20th-century Panamanian people
21st-century Panamanian people